Benedetta is a feminine given name of Italian origin, the feminine equivalent of the masculine name Benedetto, a cognate of Benedict. Notable people with the given name include:

Benedetta Barzini (born 1943), Italian actress and model
Benedetta Bianchi Porro (1936–1964), Italian Roman Catholic
Benedetta of Cagliari (1194–1233), medieval ruler of Caligiari, Sardinia
Benedetta Cambiagio Frassinello (1791–1858), Italian missionary, founder of the Benedictine Sisters of Providence, saint in the Roman Catholic Church
Benedetta Cappa (1897–1977), Italian Futurist artist and wife of Filippo Tommaso Marinetti
Benedetta Carlini (1591–1661), Catholic mystic and lesbian nun in Counter-Reformation Italy
Benedetta Ceccarelli (born 1980), Italian hurdler
Benedetta Rosmunda Pisaroni (1793–1872), Italian opera diva
Benedetta Tagliabue (born 1963), Italian architect
Benedetta Valanzano (born 1985), Italian film and television actress

See also
Benedetta (film), a 2021 French and Dutch biographical drama film